{{Infobox tennis biography
| name                        = Jo-Anne Faull 
| image                       =
| fullname                    =
| country                     = 
| birth_date                  = 
| birth_place                 = Kadina, Australia
| height                      = 
| turnedpro                   =
| retired                     =
| plays                       =
| careerprizemoney            =
| singlesrecord               = 
| singlestitles               = 0
| highestsinglesranking       = No. 61 (28 August 1989)
| AustralianOpenresult        = 2R (1988)
| FrenchOpenresult            = 4R (1989)
| Wimbledonresult             = 4R (1989)
| USOpenresult                = 1R (1988, 1989)
| doublesrecord               = 
| doublestitles               = 2
| highestdoublesranking       = No. 36 (7 December 1992) 
| AustralianOpenDoublesresult = QF (1990)
| FrenchOpenDoublesresult     = 3R (1989, 1990)
| WimbledonDoublesresult      = QF (1992, 1993)
| USOpenDoublesresult         = 2R (1990, 1991, 1992)
| Team                        =
| FedCupresult                =
}}Jo-Anne Faull''' (born 13 January 1971) is an Australian former tennis player, professional from late 1988 to January 1995.

In 1988, she was the world junior champion in women's doubles.

She achieved the best season of her career in 1989, entering the fourth round in two Grand Slam events, at Roland Garros and Wimbledon. 

During her career, she won two doubles titles on the WTA Tour.

WTA career finals

Singles: 1 (runner-up)

Doubles: 7 (2 titles, 5 runner-ups)

ITF finals

Doubles (9–2)

Award and career timeline

References

External links
 
 

Australian female tennis players
1971 births
Living people
Tennis people from South Australia
Australian Open (tennis) junior champions
Grand Slam (tennis) champions in girls' singles
Grand Slam (tennis) champions in girls' doubles
20th-century Australian women